Nobelhallen is an indoor arena in Karlskoga, Sweden. Its current capacity is 5,600 and it was built in 1971. It is the home arena of the ice hockey team BIK Karlskoga. 

The first ice hockey game inside Nobelhallen, which replaced Boforsrinken, was played on 15 October 1972, a friendly game where KB Karlskoga lost, 5–9, against Djurgården IF. Nobelhallen hosted the 1979 World Junior Ice Hockey Championships.

Nobelhallen was set to be renovated in 2021, but the multi-million Swedish krona-rebuild was postponed.

See also
List of indoor arenas in Sweden
List of indoor arenas in Nordic countries

References

External links

Nobelhallen on boforsik.com
Pictures and facts (unofficial)

Indoor ice hockey venues in Sweden
Sport in Karlskoga
Buildings and structures in Karlskoga Municipality
1972 establishments in Sweden
Sports venues completed in 1972